The men's heavyweight is a competition featured at the 2015 World Taekwondo Championships, and was held at the Traktor Ice Arena in Chelyabinsk, Russia on May 16 and May 17. Heavyweights were limited to a minimum of 87 kilograms in body mass.

Medalists

Results
Legend
DQ — Won by disqualification
P — Won by punitive declaration
R — Won by referee stop contest
W — Won by withdrawal

Finals

Top half

Section 1

Section 2

Bottom half

Section 3

Section 4

References
Draw
Results

External links
Official website

Men's 88